The National Assembly is bicameral with the lower house, the Chamber of Deputies, having 40 members elected in single-seat constituencies for a four-year term. The upper house, the Shura Council, has 40 members appointed by the King of Bahrain, with the stated aim of giving a voice to minority communities and technocratic experts within the legislative process. Supporters of the system refer to long established democracies the United Kingdom and Canada operating with this bicameralism with an appointed upper chamber and an elected lower chamber. Opponents of this system point out that unlike the bicameral systems in the UK and Canada, the Bahraini system gives the unelected upper house equal or more legislative power than the elected lower house, allowing the King to control all legislation. Opponents also point out that the current system was imposed unilaterally by the King, violating the 1973 Constitution and a 2001 signed agreement with the Bahraini opposition.

Bahrain's electoral framework is unfair, with electoral districts deliberately designed to underrepresent Shiites, who form a majority of the citizen population. The government has also allegedly drawn district boundaries to put certain political societies, including leftist and Sunni Islamist groups, at a disadvantage. The government agency responsible for administering elections is not an independent and is headed by the justice minister, a member of the royal family.

Latest elections

Nine of the 40 constituencies were decided in the first round, with the other 31 going to a runoff. According to the government, voter turnout in the first round was 67%, an increase from 53% in the 2014 elections. However, the opposition claimed that the real voter turnout did not exceed 28%-30%.

References

External links
Adam Carr's Election Archive
Women warned of 'dirty' poll fight, Gulf Daily News, 13 October 2005

 
Politics of Bahrain